Colobaea is a genus of flies in the family Sciomyzidae, the marsh flies or snail-killing flies.

Species
C. acuticerca Carles-Tolrá, 2008
C. americana Steyskal, 1954
C. beckeri (Hendel, 1902)
C. bifasciella (Fallén, 1820)
C. canadensis Knutson & Orth, 1990
C. distincta (Meigen, 1830)
C. eos Rozkosny, 1991
C. flavipleura Rozkosny, 1991
C. limbata (Hendel, 1933)
C. montana Knutson & Orth, 1990
C. nigroaristata Rozkosny, 1984
C. occidentalis Knutson, Deeming & Ebejer, 2018
C. pectoralis (Zetterstedt, 1847)
C. punctata (Lundbeck, 1923)

References

Sciomyzidae
Sciomyzoidea genera
Diptera of Europe
Diptera of North America
Diptera of Africa
Taxa named by Johan Wilhelm Zetterstedt